Kalka Dass is a former member of Lok Sabha. He is a leader of Bharatiya Janata party and among the originator of the party. He represented Karol Bagh of Delhi in  9th Lok Sabha and 10th Lok Sabha. He was Chairman of Delhi Metropolitan Council in 1977-80 as well as Leader of the Opposition from 1985 to 1989. He was first person of Bharatiya Janata party who pitched for a full state in Delhi in 1988.

References 

Year of birth missing (living people)
Living people
India MPs 1989–1991
India MPs 1991–1996
Lok Sabha members from Delhi
People from Central Delhi district
Bharatiya Janata Party politicians from Delhi